Eric Walsh may refer to:

 Eric Walsh (One Life to Live), fictional character
Eric Walsh (ambassador), Canadian diplomat

See also
Eric Welsh